The men's tournament of Water polo at the 2018 Asian Games at Jakarta, Indonesia, was held from 25 August to 1 September at the Gelora Bung Karno Aquatic Stadium.

Squads

Results
All times are Western Indonesia Time (UTC+07:00)

Preliminary round

Group A

Group B

Final round

Quarterfinals

Classification 5–8

Semifinals

Classification 7–8

Classification 5–6

Bronze medal match

Gold medal match

Final standing

References

External links
Official Result Book – Water Polo

Men